Sercombe is a surname. Notable people with the surname include:

Bob Sercombe (born 1949), Australian politician
Liam Sercombe (born 1990), English footballer
Thomas Sercombe Smith (1858–1937), British civil servant and judge

See also
Seccombe